Jordan Lenín Rezabala Anzules (born 29 February 2000) is an Ecuadorian professional footballer who plays as a midfielder for Olmedo on loan from Tijuana.

References

2000 births
Living people
Ecuadorian footballers
Ecuador youth international footballers
Ecuadorian expatriate footballers
Association football midfielders
C.S.D. Independiente del Valle footballers
Club Tijuana footballers
Ecuadorian expatriate sportspeople in Mexico
Expatriate footballers in Mexico
Ecuador under-20 international footballers